The  Schwarza is a river in the districts of Waldshut and Breisgau-Hochschwarzwald in Baden-Württemberg, Germany. It is in the Rhine drainage basin and is a right tributary of the Schlücht.

See also
List of rivers of Baden-Württemberg

Rivers of Baden-Württemberg
Rivers of the Black Forest
Rivers of Germany